Dichromorpha elegans, the short-winged grasshopper, is an insect species in the genus Dichromorpha.

References

Insects described in 1896
Acrididae